Dekalog (also known as Dekalog: The Ten Commandments and The Decalogue) is a 1989 Polish drama television miniseries directed by Krzysztof Kieślowski and co-written by Kieślowski with Krzysztof Piesiewicz, with music by Zbigniew Preisner. It consists of ten one-hour films, inspired by the decalogue of the Ten Commandments. Each short film explores characters facing one or several moral or ethical dilemmas as they live in an austere housing project in 1980s Poland.

The series, Kieślowski's most acclaimed work, was said in 2002 to be "the best dramatic work ever done specifically for television" and has won numerous international awards, though it was not widely released outside Europe until the late 1990s. It is one of fifteen films listed in the category "Values" on the Vatican film list. In 1991, filmmaker Stanley Kubrick wrote an admiring foreword to the published screenplay. According to him, Dekalog is the only masterpiece he could ever think of.

The entire series was exhibited at the 46th Venice International Film Festival.

Production
The series was conceived when screenwriter Krzysztof Piesiewicz, who had seen a 15th-century artwork illustrating the Commandments in scenes from that time period, suggested the idea of a modern equivalent. Filmmaker Krzysztof Kieślowski was interested in the philosophical challenge, and also wanted to use the series as a portrait of the hardships of Polish society, while deliberately avoiding the political issues he had depicted in earlier films. He originally meant to hire ten different directors, but decided to direct the films himself. He used a different cinematographer for each episode except III and IX, in both of which Piotr Sobociński was director of photography.

The large cast includes both famous and unknown actors, many of whom Kieślowski also used in his other films. Typically for Kieślowski, the tone of most of the films is melancholic, except for the final one, which is a black comedy, featuring two of the same actors, Jerzy Stuhr and Zbigniew Zamachowski, as in Three Colors: White.

Themes
The ten films are titled simply by number, e.g. Dekalog: One. According to film critic Roger Ebert's introduction to the DVD set, Kieślowski said that the films did not correspond exactly to the commandments, and never used their names himself. Though each film is independent, most of them share the same setting in Warsaw, and some of the characters are acquainted with each other. Each short film explores characters facing one or several moral or ethical dilemmas as they live in a large housing project in 1980s Poland. The themes can be interpreted in many different ways; however, each film has its own literality:

Recurring character of Artur Barciś
A nameless character played by Polish actor Artur Barciś appears in all but episodes 7 and 10. He observes the main characters at key moments, and never intervenes.

Milk
Milk is a recurring element in the following 7 episodes:

Cast and cinematography by episode

Reception
Dekalog was assigned a rating of 97% at review aggregator website Rotten Tomatoes based on 53 critic reviews, with an average rating of 8.95/10. The website's consensus reads, "With awe-inspiring ambition to match its powerful assemblage of acting talent, The Decalogue stands as a singular achievement in writer-director Krzysztof Kieslowski's filmography -- as well as the history of Polish cinema." It also received an average score of 100 out of 100 on Metacritic, based on 13 critic reviews, indicating "universal acclaim". It won the 1991 BAFTA TV Award for Best International Programme and the Bodil Award for Best European Film. The film also won the Best Foreign Film award from French Syndicate of Cinema Critics.

The series was praised by renowned film critics including Roger Ebert and Robert Fulford, as well as important figures from the film industry, such as Stanley Kubrick.

In the 2002 Sight & Sound poll to determine the greatest films of all time, Dekalog and A Short Film About Killing received votes from 4 critics and 3 directors, including Ebert, New Yorker critic David Denby, and director Mira Nair. Additionally, in the Sight & Sound poll held the same year to determine the top 10 films of the previous 25 years, Kieslowski was named #2 on the list of Top Directors, with votes for his films being split between Dekalog, Three Colors Red/Blue, and The Double Life of Veronique.
In the 2012 polls Dekalog received six votes from critics including Kenneth Turan and one vote from director Milcho Manchevski as the Greatest Film of All Time.

The Village Voice ranked The Decalogue at No. 112 in its Top 250 "Best Films of the Century" list in 1999, based on a poll of critics. In January 2002, the film was listed among the Top 100 "Essential Films" of all time by the National Society of Film Critics. The film ranked #36 in Empire magazine's "The 100 Best Films of World Cinema" in 2010.

According to online film resource They Shoot Pictures, Don't They?, Dekalog is the most acclaimed film of 1988.

Longer feature films
Kieślowski expanded Five and Six into longer feature films (A Short Film About Killing and A Short Film About Love), using the same cast and changing the stories slightly. This was part of a contractual obligation with the producers, since feature films were easier to distribute outside Poland. In 2000, the series was released on five DVDs, each containing two parts of about 2 hours.

References

External links

 
 
 Short overview of The Decalogue and some other Kieslowski films at www.filmref.com
 The Decalogue at the Arts & Faith Top100 Spiritually Significant Films list (2005)
 Voted #2 on The Arts and Faith Top 100 Films  (2010)
“And So On”: Kieślowski’s Dekalog and the Metaphysics of the Everyday an essay by Paul Coates at the Criterion Collection

1989 films
1989 television films
1988 drama films
1988 films
Polish television films
1980s Polish-language films
1980s Polish television series
Existentialist films
Existentialist television series
Films directed by Krzysztof Kieślowski
Films with screenplays by Krzysztof Kieślowski
Films about Christianity
Films set in Warsaw
Films shot in Poland
Ten Commandments
Philosophical fiction
Films about Jews and Judaism
1989 crime drama films